Tiny Times 4 is a 2015 Chinese romantic drama film and the fourth installment of the Tiny Times franchise directed and written by Guo Jingming. Originally scheduled for release in February 2015; it was delayed to July 2015.

Kai Ko's scenes were edited out from the film due to his drug use in September 2014.

Plot
Gu Li finds herself at a loss due to the heavy amount of debts let behind by her father. At the same time, she finds herself struck with cancer. Too proud to admit her struggle to anyone, Gu Li sets off a chain of self-destructive events, leading her to become estranged from her best friends and ultimately her boyfriend, Gu Yuan.

Meanwhile, Lin Xiao becomes engaged with the mysterious Lu Shao. Unhappy with this, Gong Xun orders her to be sacked, which in turn causes a scuffle between him and a protesting Lu Shao. Gong Xun falls into a coma, and the traumatized Lu Shao dumps Lin Xiao.

Nan Xiang, who gets a job at M.E Magazine thanks to Lin Xiao's connections, quickly reveal her true colors as she climbs the corporate ladder thanks to her new-found relationship with Lin Xiao's boss, Gong Ming.

Wan Ru, who has been disfigured due to a fight between her friends, distanced herself from the group as she struggles to heal from both the physical and emotional scar.

Cast
Yang Mi
Amber Kuo
Cheney Chen
Bea Hayden
Evonne Hsieh
Lee Hyun-jae
Vivian Dawson
Ming Ren
Jiang Chao
Wang Lin
Kiwi Shang
Anatoly Shanin 
Kai Ko (scenes edited)

Reception

Box office
The film made an estimated US$36 million in its opening weekend in China, coming in second place at the Chinese box office behind Forever Young and fourth internationally behind Minions, Terminator Genisys and Forever Young.

Critical reception
Derek Elley of Film Business Asia gave the film a 7 out of 10, calling it "a satisfying conclusion to the BFF/fashionista saga that's even, surprisingly, touching."

Box office
The film grossed RMB111 million (US$17.8 million) on the opening day including midnight release of RMB6.85 million (US$1.10 million) with total gross US$77.8 million.

Original soundtrack

References

Chinese romantic drama films
Tiny Times
2015 films
Films set in Shanghai
Films shot in Shanghai
Films based on Chinese novels
Adaptations of works by Guo Jingming
Chinese sequel films